Duncalf is a surname. Notable people with the surname include:

Dave Duncalf (1934–2003), British-born Canadian international lawn bowler
Jenny Duncalf (born 1982), British squash player